Labor Party was the name or partial name of a number of United States political parties which were organized during the 1870s and 1880s.

History
By 1877 the party changed its name to the Socialist Labor Party of North America, and continued under that name until the early 21st century. 

In 1877, the racist Workingman's Party was formed in California, led by Denis Kearney; by 1879 it was powerful enough to help re-write the state constitution of California, inserting provisions intended to curb the powers of capital and to abolish Chinese contract labor.

In 1878, the Greenback Party, under the influence of leaders of organized labor, changed its name to the Greenback Labor Party, and continued to operate in some states, electing a congressman as late as 1886; but by 1888 had dissipated. In 1886, a United Labor Party was organized in Chicago under the leadership of that city's Central Labor Union; It drew over 20,000 votes for its county ticket in the fall of 1886, and in the following spring elections garnered 28,000 votes for its candidate for Mayor; but by 1888 it had merged with the Democratic Party in that city.

In Wisconsin the Milwaukee Trades' Assembly, later re-organized into a Union Labor Party, was organized by labor leaders, originally as a fusion of the Greenback Party and Anti-Monopoly Party under the name People's Party. The movement was strongly supported by the local socialists, and obtained considerable results in the city of Milwaukee, electing a state senator, several members of the State Assembly (including Michael P. Walsh, their president) and a member of Congress, Henry Smith. In other states there were groupings known variously as United Labor Party, Union Labor Party, Industrial Labor Party, Labor Reform Party, or simply Labor Party.

Activity
These parties were made up in varying proportions of members of the American Federation of Labor and Knights of Labor, socialists, Greenbackers, and even anarchists, and challenged the Republicans and Democrats primarily in local elections and state elections, but not at the presidential level. The most important of these local races of that period may have been that in New York City in 1886, when the United Labor Party of that city nominated Henry George for mayor of New York, and cast for him 68,000 votes. The Single Taxers and socialists united in this vote, the Socialists supporting the George candidacy as a popular movement against corporate capitalism. But by 1887 the United Labor Party of New York State nominated Henry George for Secretary of State, repudiating socialism. Socialist Labor members, combining with other labor organizations, formed a Progressive Labor Party, nominating John Swinton to run against Henry George. The Progressive Labor Party vote of about 5000 was virtually confined to New York City.

In 1888 two "labor parties" appeared in the field of presidential politics, namely: (1) the Union Labor Party, which was formed by a coalition of the Greenback Labor Party, largely rural in its constituency, with the urban trade union movement, which had been demanding labor and industrial reforms: it nominated Alson Streeter for president; and (2) the United Labor Party, a much smaller party, which under leadership of a Father Edward McGlynn, of New York, demanded the recognition single tax and the sharing of the rent of land. These parties both disappeared after the campaign of 1888.

Legacy
For varying reasons, none of these organizations maintained their existence as separate parties. The constituents and activists became involved either in one of the major parties (as in the Chicago example) or in such movements as the Populists (which in urban areas drew heavily on former Labor Party advocates), or the Socialist Party of America, and their various splinter groups.

There is no direct continuity between any of these organizations and the Union Labor Party of early 20th-century San Francisco, California; nor with the Duluth, Minnesota Union Labor Party which elected William Leighton Carss to Congress and various candidates to city offices in that region in the early 20th century, before merging into the Minnesota Farmer-Labor Party.

Notes

Further reading

 Denton, Charles Richard. "The American nonconformist and Kansas industrial liberator: a Kansas union labor-populist newspaper, 1886-1891." (1961).

 McCollom, Jason. "The Agricultural Wheel, the Union Labor Party, and the 1889 Arkansas Legislature." Arkansas Historical Quarterly 68.2 (2009): 157-175. online

McLaughlin, Andrew Cunningham & Hart, Albert Bushnell. Cyclopedia of American Government. New York, London: D. Appleton and Co., 1914. , p. 296. online
 McNitt, Andrew W. "Union Labor Party, 1887–1888" in Immanuel Ness, and James Ciment, eds. The Encyclopedia of Third Parties in America (Sharpe Reference, 2000) 3:569–572.

Defunct political parties in the United States
Labor parties in the United States